Techi Tatra (born 13 February 2000) is an Indian professional footballer who plays as a midfielder for Aizawl F.C. in the I-League.

Career 
He made his professional debut for the Aizawl against Mohun Bagan on 30 November 2019, He was brought in as substitute in the 90+3 minute as Aizawl drew 0–0.

Career statistics

References

2000 births
Living people
People from Kurung Kumey district
Indian footballers
Aizawl FC players  
Footballers from Arunachal Pradesh
I-League players
Association football midfielders